Melker Nilsson (born 26 April 2000) is a Swedish football midfielder who plays for Falkenbergs FF.

References

2000 births
Living people
Swedish footballers
Association football midfielders
Falkenbergs FF players
Allsvenskan players